In South Africa, the Executive Council of a province is the cabinet of the provincial government. The Executive Council consists of the Premier and five to ten other members, who have the title "Member of the Executive Council", commonly abbreviated to "MEC".

MECs are appointed by the Premier from amongst the members of the provincial legislature; the Premier can also dismiss them. The provincial legislature may force the Premier to reconstitute the council by passing a motion of no confidence in the Executive Council excluding the Premier; if the legislature passes a motion of no confidence in the Executive Council including the Premier, then the Premier and the MECs must resign.

The Premier designates powers and functions to the MECs; conventionally they are assigned portfolios in specific areas of responsibility. They are accountable to the provincial legislature, both individually and as a collective, and must regularly report to the legislature on the performance of their responsibilities.

The Western Cape, the only province to have adopted its own constitution, chose to call its executive council the "Provincial Cabinet", and its MECs "Provincial Ministers".

Membership of executive councils

The following tables show the members of the nine Executive Councils .

Eastern Cape

Free State

Gauteng

KwaZulu-Natal

Limpopo

Mpumalanga

North West

Northern Cape

Western Cape

References

Provincial governments of South Africa